Walter Sully (1895–1970) was an Australian cinematographer who worked for Cinesound Productions, Frank Hurley and Movietone. He was one of the leading newsreel cameramen of the 1930s.

Select credits
A Romance of Burke and Wills Expedition of 1860 (1918)
Jewelled Nights (1925)
Jungle Woman (1926)
The Hound of the Deep (1926)
The Kingdom of Twilight (1928)
The Birth of White Australia (1928)
Thar She Blows! (1931)
Showgirl's Luck (1931)
On Our Selection (1932)

References

External links

Australian cinematographers
1895 births
1970 deaths